Zatrephes miniata is a moth of the family Erebidae. It was described by Walter Rothschild in 1909. It is found in Brazil (Amazonas) and French Guiana.

References

Phaegopterina
Moths of South America
Taxa named by Walter Rothschild
Moths described in 1909